Robert L. Jackson (born August 15, 1955) is an American politician who has served in the Mississippi State Senate from the 11th district since 2004.

References

1955 births
Living people
People from Lambert, Mississippi
Democratic Party Mississippi state senators
African-American state legislators in Mississippi
21st-century American politicians
21st-century African-American politicians
20th-century African-American people